Stadion Au is a multi-use stadium in Brugg, Switzerland.  It is currently used mostly for football matches and is the home ground of FC Brugg.

References
  

Au
Brugg